Bluff Master may refer to:
 Bluff Master (1963 film), a Hindi film directed by Manmohan Desai
 Bluff Master (2018 film), a Telugu film directed by Gopi Ganesh Pattabhi

See also 
 Bluffmaster!, a 2005 Hindi film directed by Rohan Sippy